The 2008–09 Argentine Primera B Nacional was the 23rd season of second division professional of football in Argentina. A total of 20 teams competed; the champion and runner-up were promoted to Argentine Primera División.

Club information

Standings

Promotion/relegation playoff Legs Primera División-Primera B Nacional
The 3rd and 4th placed of the table played with the 18th and the 17th placed of the Relegation Table of 2008–09 Primera División.

|-
!colspan="5"|Relegation/promotion playoff 1

|-
!colspan="5"|Relegation/promotion playoff 2

Gimnasia de La Plata (LP) remains in Primera División after a 3-3 aggregate tie by virtue of a "sports advantage". In case of a tie in goals, the team from the Primera División gets to stay in it.
Rosario Central remains in Primera División by winning the playoff.

Relegation

Note: Clubs with indirect affiliation with AFA are relegated to the Torneo Argentino A, while clubs directly affiliated face relegation to Primera B Metropolitana. Clubs with direct affiliation are all from Greater Buenos Aires, with the exception of Newell's, Rosario Central, Central Córdoba and Argentino de Rosario, all from Rosario, and Unión and Colón from Santa Fe.

The bottom two teams of this table face relegation regardless of their affiliation status. Apart from them, the bottom teams of each affiliation face promotion/relegation playoffs against Torneo Argentino A and Primera B Metropolitana's "Reducido" (reduced tournaments) champions. The Reducidos are played after those leagues' champions are known.

Relegation Playoff Legs

|-
!colspan="5"|Relegation/promotion playoff 1 (Direct affiliation vs. Primera B Metropolitana)

|-
!colspan="5"|Relegation/promotion playoff 2 (Indirect affiliation vs. Torneo Argentino A)

|-
|}

 Deportivo Merlo was promoted to 2009–10 Primera B Nacional by winning the playoff and Los Andes was relegated to the 2009–10 Primera B Metropolitana.
 CAI remained in the Primera B Nacional by winning the playoff.

Season statistics

Top scorers

See also
2008–09 in Argentine football

References

External links

2008–09 in Argentine football
Primera B Nacional seasons